Pritam Singh is an Indian politician who is a six-term Member of Legislative Assembly (MLA) from Chakrata,  Uttarakhand Legislative Assembly. A member of the Indian National Congress he has served as the Leader of Opposition (CLP Leader Uttarakhand) in the  Uttarakhand Legislative Assembly and has also served as the president of Uttarakhand Pradesh Congress Committee (Uttarakhand PCC). He is a six-term Member of the Uttarakhand Legislative Assembly. During the Congress government (2002–2007 and 2012–2017) in Uttarakhand he had served as a Cabinet Minister for Home, Rural Development, Food and Civil Supplies, Panchayti Raj and Minor Irrigation in Government of Uttarakhand. He was also elected as a Member of the Uttar Pradesh Legislative Assembly in 1993. Singh represents Chakrata assembly.

Early life and education
Singh was born in Virnad village in Dehradun district of the Uttar Pradesh (now Uttarakhand) on 11 November 1958 in a Rajput family. Pritam Singh is the eldest son of Gulab Singh who was a member of the Indian National Congress, an eight term Member of the Uttar Pradesh Legislative Assembly and also served as minister during the Congress government in Uttar Pradesh. Gulab Singh was elected unopposed to the Uttar Pradesh Legislative Assembly in the year 1985. Pritam Singh is a law graduate and a member of the Bar Council of Uttarakhand. He is married to Anita Singh and has one daughter and one son.

Positions held

Electoral Performances

References

Living people
Indian National Congress politicians
Uttarakhand politicians
Uttarakhand MLAs 2002–2007
1958 births
Uttarakhand MLAs 2007–2012
Uttarakhand MLAs 2012–2017
Uttarakhand MLAs 2017–2022
Uttarakhand MLAs 2022–2027